Pylewell Park is a country house and park near Lymington in Hampshire. It is listed as grade II*.

History
A settlement on the site of Baddesley Manor, to the North of the current house, is mentioned in the Domesday Book. Sir Richard Worsley lived in Pylewell Ground in 1609. During the 17th century, Pylewell estate was fortified to Jacobean Lodge.

From 1787 to 1801 Thomas Robbins bought the park and removed most of the formal gardens elements and introduced ornamental walks and informal schemes of parkland. Thomas Weld acquired the estate in 1801 for his third son, Joseph, as a wedding gift. Joseph, aged 25 years, actively dealt with all affairs of the estate up to 1828. He made extensive enhancements to the gardens and farms such as North Park improvements in 1818. Additionally, in 1822 the South Lake was constructed. More improvements continued including the avenue of southern Solent in additional to lay grounds in the formal garden and this occurred in the early eighteen century. By 1854, William Peers of Williams's Freeman started improving Weld's construction as well as the Pylewell grounds. A circular parterre was included in the house of the southeast as more land was bought in the school village of Baddesley.

William Ingham Whitaker acquired the Pylewell estate in 1874. As soon as he acquired the estate, he added a new lodge and drive among other important changes to the house. After his death in 1893 his son William Ingham Whitaker, succeeded him and made more significant alterations. In 1903 he married and traveled to Japan. Accordingly, he developed the pleasure grounds with Australasian and Asian plant collections including bridges and a new lily pond. The East and West wings of the house, which had been added in the early 20th century, were demolished in 1951.

References

External links
Pylewell Park
Historic England: Pylewell Park

Buildings and structures in Lymington
Country estates in England
!